Core Gateway College, formerly Colleges of the Republic, is a community college in San Jose City, Nueva Ecija, Philippines. The college was founded by Dr. Anacleto E. Agaton in February 1948. The College was renamed Core Gateway College

Brief history

The Colleges of the Republic was established in 1948 as part of the post-war rebuilding effort in the town of San Jose, Nueva Ecija. The institution has served San Jose City and its surrounding communities for over sixty five years.

Courses offered

School of Graduate Studies

Master of Arts in Education  
Majors in: Filipino, Education Management, Guidance and Counseling, Mathematics Education
Master in Public Administration

College Department 
Bachelor of Secondary Education
Majors in: Biological Science, Physical science, Social Studies, Filipino, English, Math and PEHM
Bachelor of Elementary Education
Bachelor of Science in Commerce
Majors in: Management Accounting and Business Management
Bachelor of Arts in Political Science
Bachelor of Science in Computer Science
Associate in Computer Technology

Basic Education
High School
Elementary
Pre-Elementary

References

External links
58 years of celebrating education towards a culture of excellence

Universities and colleges in Nueva Ecija
San Jose, Nueva Ecija